Harry Hallas Hellawell (November 6, 1888 – March 16, 1968) was an American long-distance runner. He competed in the men's 10,000 metres at the 1912 Summer Olympics. He also competed in the cross country running race at the same Games. He competed for the South Paterson Athletic Club and New York Athletic Club.

References

External links
 

1888 births
1968 deaths
Athletes (track and field) at the 1912 Summer Olympics
American male long-distance runners
Olympic track and field athletes of the United States
Place of birth missing
Olympic cross country runners
20th-century American people